The tripling-oriented Doche–Icart–Kohel curve is a form of an elliptic curve that has been used lately in cryptography; it is a particular type of Weierstrass curve. At certain conditions some operations, as adding, doubling or tripling points, are faster to compute using this form.
The Tripling oriented Doche–Icart–Kohel curve, often called with the abbreviation 3DIK has been introduced by Christophe Doche, Thomas Icart, and David R. Kohel in

Definition

Let  be a field of characteristic different form 2 and 3.

An elliptic curve in tripling oriented Doche–Icart–Kohel form is defined by the equation:

 

A general point P on  has affine coordinates . The "point at infinity" represents the neutral element for the group law and it is written in projective coordinates as O = (0:1:0). The negation of a point P = (x, y) with respect to this neutral element is −P = (x, −y).

The group law

Consider an elliptic curve in the Tripling-oriented Doche-Icart-Kohel form in affine coordinates:

 

As in other forms of elliptic curves, it is possible to define some "operations" between points, such as adding points, or doubling (See also The group law). In the following sections formulas to add, negate and doubling points are given. The addition and doubling formulas are often used for other operations: given a point P on an elliptic curve it is possible to compute [n]P, where n is an integer, using addition and doubling; computing multiples of points is important in elliptic curve cryptography and in Lenstra elliptic curve factorization.

Addition

Doubling

Negation

New Jacobian coordinates

For computing on these curves points are usually represented in new Jacobian coordinates (Jn):

a point in the new Jacobian coordinates is of the form ; moreover:

 

for any .

This means, for example, that the point  and the point  (for ) are actually the same.

 

The term  of a point on the curve makes the mixed addition (that is the addition between two points in different systems of coordinates) more efficient.

Algorithms and examples

Addition

The result is a point .
It is assumed that  and that .
The cost of this implementation is 7M + 4S + 1*a3 + 10add + 3*2 + 1*4, where M indicates the multiplications, S the squarings, a3 indicates the multiplication by the constant a3, add represents the number of additions required.

Example

Let  and  affine points on the elliptic curve over :

.

Then:

      

      

      

      

      

      

      

      

      

Notice that in this case .

Doubling

The following algorithm represents the doubling of a point  on an elliptic curve in the Tripling-oriented Doche-Icart-Kohel form.
It is assumed that , .
The cost of this implementation is 2M + 7S + 1*a2 + 1*a3 + 12add + 2*2 + 1*3 + 1*8; here M represents the multiplications, S the squarings, a2 and a3 indicates the multiplications by the constants a2 and a3 respectively, and add indicates the additions.

Example

Then:

      

      

Notice that here the point is in affine coordinates, so .

Equivalence with Weierstrass form

Any elliptic curve is birationally equivalent to another written in the Weierstrass form.

The following twisted tripling-oriented Doche-Icart-Kohel curve:

can be transformed into the Weierstrass form by the map:

In this way  becomes:

.

Conversely, given an elliptic curve in the Weierstrass form:

,

it is possible to find the "corresponding" Tripling-oriented Doche–Icart–Kohel curve, using the following relation:

where  is a root of the polynomial

where

is the j-invariant of the elliptic curve .

Notice that in this case the map given is not only a birational equivalence, but an isomorphism between curves.

Internal link

For more informations about the running-time required in a specific case, see Table of costs of operations in elliptic curves

Notes

External links
 http://hyperelliptic.org/EFD/g1p/index.html

References

 
 
 
http://hyperelliptic.org/EFD/g1p/auto-3dik-standard.html

Elliptic curves
Elliptic curve cryptography